Come On Board is the sixth album by anti-folk artist Jeffrey Lewis, and the first credited to Peter Stampfel and Jeffrey Lewis. Peter Stampfel was a founding member of American folk music band The Holy Modal Rounders. In an interview with Audio Antihero for GoldFlakePaint, Lewis revealed that a follow up album was due in 2013.

Track listing 
 CD OJD-0307

 "Come On Board"
 "20,000 Leagues Under the Sea"
 "Bottlecaps Are Cool"
 "Busted"
 "I Spent the Night In the Wax Museum"
 "He's Been Everywhere"
 "God, What Am I Doing Here?"
 "Billy (Cross Over The Bamboo Field)"
 "Love, Love, Love, Love"
 "Gong Of Zero"
 "Hoodoo Bash"
 "Little Sister In The Sky"
 "On We Went"

References

External links 
The official Jeffrey Lewis website
Russian-english podcast about Jeffrey Lewis in Moscow

2011 albums
Jeffrey Lewis albums